This is a list of CFA International referees. in the FIFA official competitions (or their qualifications).

Referee list

Male 

'' Current international referee

 CNPCSA=China National Petroleum Corporation Sports Association, is a mass sports organization in the national oil industry
 CQSA=China Qianwei Sports Association, is an organization affiliated with the Ministry of Public Security responsible for sports activities of the national public security organs and the armed police forces.

References 

Chinese referees and umpires